The 2004 Worthing Borough Council election took place on 10 June 2004 to elect members of Worthing Borough Council in West Sussex, England. The whole council was up for election with boundary changes since the last election 2003 increasing the number of seats by 1. The Conservative Party gained overall control of the council from no overall control. Overall turnout was 38.23%.

The campaign saw a debate between the two main parties on the council over development in Worthing and the fate of the local swimming pool Aquarina. The results saw the Conservatives make significant gains from the Liberal Democrats to take power in Worthing. The top Liberal Democrat to lose in the election was the leader of the council, Sheila Player, who came fourth in Selden ward and failed to be elected as a result. The defeat for the Liberal Democrats was put down to anger over a warning that they might have to close the local museum, art gallery and swimming pool to save money.

Election result

Ward results

References

2004 English local elections
2004
2000s in West Sussex